BasicNeeds is a global mental health organization, working to improve the lives of people living with mental illness and or epilepsy. In July 2017, It was merged into the Christian disability charity CBM UK.

BasicNeeds organization has helped people recover from mental illness and sustain good mental health by community support and free treatment, most especially to those living in resource-poor environments. The organization is goal is to help people in low and middle income countries.

Background

BasicNeeds was established in 2000 by Chris Underhill MBE. It was set up because of the factors which the WHO report highlighted, and through its programs attempts to ensure that mental health is given due attention.

BasicNeeds was a response to the lack of real mental health care in lower and middle income countries. Since its foundation, BasicNeeds has helped over 657,000 people with mental illness or epilepsy as well as their families and carers in India, Sri Lanka, Ghana, Tanzania, Kenya, Uganda, Laos, Vietnam, Nepal, China, Pakistan and South Sudan.

Approach 
BasicNeeds' mission is to enable people living with mental illness and epilepsy and their families to live and work successfully in their communities by combining health, socio-economic and community oriented solutions with changes in policy, practice and resource allocation.

BasicNeeds' innovative Model for Mental Health and Development takes a holistic approach to community-based mental health care and consists of five inter-linking modules:

 Capacity building: Identifying, mobilizing, sensitizing and training mental health and development stakeholders 
 Community Mental Health: Enabling effective and affordable community oriented mental health treatment services
 Livelihoods: Facilitating opportunities for affected individuals to gain or regain the ability to work, earn and contribute to family and community life
 Research: Generating evidence from the practice of mental health and development
 Collaboration: Forging partnerships with stakeholders who are involved in implementing the model on the ground and/or are responsible for policy and practice decisions to improve mental health provision.

Scale and impact

References

External links
BasicNeeds
BasicNeeds Annual Impact Report 2015
Mental Health Innovation Network: BasicNeeds

Charities based in Warwickshire
Health in Cambridgeshire
International development agencies
Mental health organisations in the United Kingdom
Organisations based in Cambridgeshire
South Cambridgeshire District